"Jag ljuger så bra" ("I lie so well") is the third single from Swedish pop singer Linda Bengtzing, released on her debut studio album Ingenting att förlora during the first quarter of 2006.  Bengtzing performed the song in Melodifestivalen 2006, finishing seventh in the finale.

The song, composed especially for Melodifestivalen by Lars Diedricson, Martin Hedström, and Ingela “Pling” Forsman, was originally written for another artist, Jessica Andersson, who instead chose "Kalla nätter" ("Cold Nights") to perform at the contest.

Track listing
Jag ljuger så bra (Radio Version) 3:08
Jag ljuger så bra (Karaoke Version) 3:06

Melodifestivalen 2006
On February 18, 2006, Bengtzing's performance of the song qualified for the final round of Melodifestivalen 2006 by placing 2nd at the first semifinal in the city of Leksand. At the final in Stockholm, it finished in 7th place with 56 points, 34 from juries and 22 from public (138,249 televotes).

Chart positions
The single was released in Sweden on March 13, 2006, debuting at #23 on the Swedish singles chart three days later. It rose to #4 the next week and peaked at #2 during its fifth week on the charts. It stayed in the Swedish top 60 for a total of 20 weeks.

Svensktoppen
The song directly entered the fourth place at Svensktoppen on 9 April 2006. A third place was the best result there. On 13 August 2006, Jag ljuger så bra made its 19th and last Svensktoppen visit.

See also
Melodifestivalen 2006

References
swedishcharts.com - Linda Bengtzing - Jag ljuger så bra

External links
"Jag ljuger så bra" at the Swedish singles chart

2006 singles
Melodifestivalen songs of 2006
Songs with lyrics by Ingela Forsman
Linda Bengtzing songs
Songs written by Lars Diedricson
2006 songs